Senju is a Japanese surname.

People with the surname include:
 Akira Senju (born 1960), a Japanese composer, arranger and conductor
 Hiroshi Senju (born 1958), a Japanese painter
 Miyazono Senju IV (1899–1985), a Japanese singer and shamisen player

Fictional characters 

 Hashirama Senju, a character in the manga and anime series Naruto
 Tobirama Senju, a character from the manga and anime series Naruto
 Tsunade Senju, a character from the manga and anime series Naruto

See also
 Kita-Senju Station, in Tokyo
 Minami-Senju Station, in Tokyo
 Senju-ji, a Buddhist temple
 Senju Thermal Power Station, in Tokyo

Japanese-language surnames